This page is an index of sustainability articles.

A 
Adiabatic lapse rate -
Air pollution control -
Air pollution dispersion modeling -
Allotment (gardening) -
Anaerobic digestion -
Anthropogenic -
Anthroposystem -
Applied Sustainability -
Appropriate technology -
Aquaculture -
Aquatic ecosystem -
Ashden Awards

B 
Back-to-the-land movement -
Bagasse -
Behavioral ecology -
Biobutanol -
Biodegradable plastics -
Bioenergy -
Bioenergy village -
Biofuel in Brazil -
Biofuel in the United States -
Biofuel -
Biofuelwatch -
Biogas -
Biogas powerplant -
Biogeochemistry -
Blue bag

C 
Carbon accounting -
Carbon economy -
Carbon footprint -
Catchwater -
Causal layered analysis -
Center for Environmental Technology -
Centre on Sustainable Consumption and Production -
Circles of Sustainability -
Circular economy -
Clean technology -
Cleaner production -
Climate change -
Coal depletion -
Commission on Sustainable Development -
Compost -
Composting -
Computational Sustainability -
Confederation of European Environmental Engineering Societies -
Conservation biology -
Conservation Commons -
Conservation development -
Conservation ethic -
Conservation movement -
Consumables -
Convention on the Prohibition of Military or Any Other Hostile Use of Environmental Modification Techniques -
Cornucopian -
Corporate social responsibility -
Corporate sustainability -
Cradle to Cradle Design -
Cultural sustainability

D 
Deforestation -
Demography -
Depopulation -
Desertification -
Directive on the Promotion of the use of biofuels and other renewable fuels for transport -
Diseases of poverty -
Downsizer -
Drawbridge mentality

E 
Earth Charter -
Earth observation satellite -
Earthscan -
Eco hotels -
Eco-cities -
Eco-efficiency -
Eco-industrial park -
Eco-sufficiency -
Ecoforestry -
Ecolabel -
Ecological deficit -
Ecological economics -
Ecological footprint -
Ecological humanities -
Ecological literacy -
Ecological sanitation -
Ecological threshold -
Ecologically sustainable development -
Ecosharing -
Ecosystem-based management -
Ecosystem management -
Ecotax -
Ecotechnology -
Ecotourism -
Ecovillages -
Electric vehicle -
Emissions trading -
Energy conservation -
Energy content of biofuel -
Energy crop -
Energy density -
Energy descent -
Energy development -
Energy economics -
Efficient energy use -
Energy Policy Act of 2005 -
Energy saving modules -
Energy security -
Environmental accounting  -
Environmental archaeology -
Environmental audits -
Environmental benefits of vegetarianism -
Environmental biotechnology -
Environmental Change Network -
Environmental chemistry -
Environmental concerns with electricity generation -
Environmental consulting -
Environmental control system -
Environmental defense -
Environmental design -
Environmental design and planning -
Environmental disaster -
Environmental determinism -
Environmental economics -
Environmental effects on physiology -
Environmental engineering -
Environmental enterprise -
Environmental ethics -
Environmental factor -
Environmental finance -
Environmental geography -
Environmental geology -
Environmental gradient -
Environmental hazard -
Environmental health -
Environmental impact assessment -
Environmental impact of fishing -
Environmental impact report -
Environmental Information Regulations 2004 -
Environmental journalism -
Environmental justice -
Environmental law -
Environmental Life Force -
Environmental management -
Environmental management scheme -
Environmental Measurements Laboratory -
Environmental medicine -
Environmental microbiology -
Environmental Modeling Center -
Environmental movement -
Environmental movement in New Zealand -
Environmental movement in the United States -
Environmental planning -
Environmental preservation -
Environmental pricing reform -
Environmental protection in Japan -
Environmental psychology -
Environmental Quality Improvement Act -
Environmental racism -
Environmental racism in Europe - Environmental remediation -
Environmental Research Letters -
Environmental restoration -
Environmental Risk Management Authority -
Environmental science -
Environmental security -
Environmental skepticism -
Environmental sociology -
Environmental standard -
Environmental studies -
Environmental suit -
Environmental Sustainability Index -
Environmental technology -
Environmental Technology Laboratory -
Environmental Technology Verification Program -
Environmental toxins and fetal development -
Environmental transport association -
Environmental vandalism -
Environmental vegetarianism -
Environmental, Safety and Health Communication -
Environmentalism -
EPA Sustainability -
Epidemics -
Ethanol fuel -
Ethical consumerism -
Eugenics -
European Biofuels Technology Platform

F 
Factory Green -
Famine -
Farmer field school -
Food Race -
Food Routes Network -
Food security -
Food, Conservation, and Energy Act of 2008 -
Foreshoreway

G 
Gasification -
Geothermal power -
Global Environment Outlook -
Global Reporting Initiative -
Global warming -
Glossary of climate change -
Glossary of environmental science -
Green anarchy -
Green banking -
Green brands -
Green building -
Green cities -
Green cleaning -
Green computing -
Green conventions -
Green crude -
Green development -
Green energy design -
Green gross domestic product -
Green museum -
Green Revolution -
Green syndicalism -
Ground-coupled heat exchanger

H 
Hannover Principles -
Heating oil -
Holocene extinction event -
Hubbert Peak Theory -
Human development index -
Human development theory -
Human migration -
Humanistic capitalism -
Hybrid vehicle -
Hydrogen technologies

I 
Immigration -
Immigration reduction -
Impact investing -
Import substitution industries -
Inclusive business -
Industrial biotechnology -
Industrial ecology -
Industrial symbiosis -
Industrial wastewater treatment -
Inhabitat -
Integrated catchment management -
Integrated Multi-trophic Aquaculture -
International Institute for Environment and Development -
International Year of Forests

J 
Joint Forest Management

K 
Kyoto Protocol

L 
Langkawi Declaration -
Life cycle assessment -
Lifeboat ethics -
List of climate change topics -
List of conservation topics -
List of environmental degrees -
List of environmental health hazards -
List of environmental issues - 
List of environmental studies topics -
List of global sustainability statistics -
List of large wind farms -
List of religious populations -
List of renewable energy topics by country -
List of sustainability programs in North America -
List of vegetable oils -
Local food -
Low impact development -
Low-carbon economy

M 
Maldevelopment -
Material efficiency -
Material input per unit of service -
Medieval demography -
Megalopolis (city type) -
Melbourne Principles -
Metapattern -
Micro-sustainability -
Mitigation of peak oil -
Multiple chemical sensitivity

N 
Natural building -
Natural resource management -
Nature conservation -
Net metering -
New Classical Architecture -
New Urbanism

O 
Oceanway -
Over-consumption

P 
Participatory technology development -
Peak coal -
Peak copper -
Peak gas -
Peak oil -
Peak uranium -
Permaculture -
Permeable paving -
Photovoltaic array -
Photovoltaics in transport -
Planetary boundaries -
Population ageing -
Population biology -
Population control -
Population decline -
Population density -
Population ecology -
Population growth -
Population pyramid -
Promession -
Public ecology

R
Radical sustainability -
Rain garden -
Rainwater tank -
Reconciliation ecology -
Recycling -
Reef Check -
Renewable energy development -
Renewable energy -
Renewable resources -
Rio Declaration on Environment and Development -
Risks to civilization, humans and planet Earth

S 
Seafood watch -
Self-sufficiency -
Seven generation sustainability -
Silicon valley -
Simple living -
Smithsonian Environmental Research Center -
Soil conservation -
Soil erosion -
Soil health -
Solar cell -
Solar heating -
Solar lamp -
Solar power -
Solar power satellite -
Solar savings fraction -
Spaceship earth -
Space sustainability -
Steady-state economy
Straight vegetable oil -
Strategic Environmental Assessment -
Strategic Sustainable Development -
Sustainability -
Sustainability accounting -
Sustainability appraisal -
Sustainability governance -
Sustainability (journal) -
Sustainability organisations -
Sustainability reporting -
Sustainability science -
Sustainable advertising -
Sustainable agriculture -
Sustainable architecture -
Sustainable art -
Sustainable building -
Sustainable business -
Sustainable city -
Sustainable community -
Sustainable design -
Sustainable development -
Sustainable distribution -
Sustainable energy -
Sustainable fashion -
Sustainable food system -
Sustainable forest management -
Sustainable gardening -
Sustainable habitat -
Sustainable industries -
Sustainable landscape architecture -
Sustainable lighting -
Sustainable living -
Sustainable national income -
Sustainable packaging -
Sustainable population -
Sustainable procurement -
Sustainable product development -
Sustainable product development and design -
Sustainable regional development -
Sustainable resource extraction -
Sustainable sanitation -
Sustainable technology -
Sustainable tourism -
Sustainable transport -
Sustainable urban drainage systems -
Sustainable urban infrastructure

T 
The good life -
The Institution of Environmental Sciences -
The Natural Step -
The People & Planet Green League -
The Science of Survival -
Tragedy of the commons -
Transition town

U 
United Nations Environment Programme -
United States Green Chamber of Commerce -
Urban density -
Urban horticulture -
Urban oasis -
Urban sprawl

V 
Value of Earth -
Variable retention -
Vegetable oil economy

W 
Waste management -
Waste vegetable oil -
Waste water treatment -
Water conservation -
Water crisis -
Water purification -
Wave farm -
Weak and strong sustainability -
Wind power -
Wind power in the United Kingdom -
Wind turbine -
World energy consumption -
World largest cities

See also 

 List of environmental issues
 Lists of environmental topics
 List of conservation topics

 
Sustainability